Clavariadelphus is a genus of club fungi in the family Clavariadelphaceae. The genus has a widespread distribution in temperate areas, and contains an estimated 19 species.
The name might mean uterus-shaped club, from the Latin clava meaning club and the Greek delphus meaning uterus.

Species
Clavariadelphus americanus (Corner) Methven (1989)
Clavariadelphus caespitosus Methven (1989)
Clavariadelphus cokeri V.L.Wells & Kempton (1968)
Clavariadelphus fasciculatus Methven & Guzmán (1989)
Clavariadelphus flavidus Methven (1989)
Clavariadelphus flavoimmaturus R.H.Petersen (1974)
Clavariadelphus helveticus Rahm & Schild (1974)
Clavariadelphus himalayensis Methven (1989)
Clavariadelphus lignicola R.H.Petersen (1974)
Clavariadelphus ligula (Schaeff.) Donk (1933)
Clavariadelphus mirus (Pat.) Corner (1950)
Clavariadelphus mucronatus V.L.Wells & Kempton (1968)
Clavariadelphus occidentalis Methven (1989)
Clavariadelphus pakistanicus Hanif & Khalid (2014)
Clavariadelphus pallidoincarnatus Methven (1989)
Clavariadelphus pistillaris (L.) Donk (1933)
Clavariadelphus sachalinensis (S.Imai) Corner (1950)
Clavariadelphus subfastigiatus V.L.Wells & Kempton (1968)
Clavariadelphus truncatus Donk (1933)
Clavariadelphus unicolor (Berk. & Ravenel) Corner (1950)
Clavariadelphus xanthocephalus Rahm & Schild (1977)
Clavariadelphus yunnanensis Methven (1989)

References

External links

Gomphales
Agaricomycetes genera
Taxa named by Marinus Anton Donk
Taxa described in 1933